The 2009 National Invitation Tournament was a single-elimination tournament of 32 National Collegiate Athletic Association (NCAA) Division I teams that were not selected to participate in the 2009 NCAA Division I men's basketball tournament.  The 72nd annual tournament began on March 17 on campus sites and ended on April 2 at Madison Square Garden in New York City, with Penn State winning the final 69–63 over Baylor.

Participants

Automatic qualifiers
The following teams won their conference regular season title, but failed to win conference post season tournaments.  Therefore, they were not awarded their respective conference's automatic bid to the NCAA Tournament.  When they did not receive at-large selections to the NCAA tournament either, they automatically qualified for the 2009 NIT.

Seedings

Bracket
Played on the home court of the higher-seeded team (except #4 Miami (FL) at #5 Providence)

Semifinals and finals
Played at Madison Square Garden in New York City on March 31 and April 2

* denotes each overtime played

Game summaries

NIT Championship

The Penn State Nittany Lions faced off against the Baylor Bears in the NIT Championship game. The Nittany Lions won the matchup 69–63, aided by Jamelle Cornley's 18 points. In a four-point deficit at the half, the Lions went on a 7–1 spurt to take a 2-point lead at the beginning of the second. After the Bears tied it at 37, Penn State made three consecutive threes from which Baylor could not recover.

See also
 2009 Women's National Invitation Tournament
 2009 NCAA Division I men's basketball tournament
 2009 NCAA Division II men's basketball tournament
 2009 NCAA Division III men's basketball tournament
 2009 NCAA Division I women's basketball tournament
 2009 NCAA Division II women's basketball tournament
 2009 NCAA Division III women's basketball tournament
 2009 NAIA Division I men's basketball tournament
 2009 NAIA Division II men's basketball tournament
 2009 NAIA Division I women's basketball tournament
 2009 NAIA Division II women's basketball tournament
 2009 College Basketball Invitational
 2009 CollegeInsider.com Postseason Tournament

References

National Invitation
National Invitation Tournament
2000s in Manhattan
National Invitation Tournament
Basketball in New York City
College sports in New York City
Madison Square Garden
National Invitation Tournament
National Invitation Tournament
Sports competitions in New York City
Sports in Manhattan